Ron Groenewoud (born 24 January 1937) is a former Dutch footballer and football manager.

Playing career 
During his football career, he played as a defender for Velocitas 1897 from Groningen.

Managerial career 
After his playing career, he was assistant coach at Sparta for three years, under head coaches Denis Neville and Bill Thompson. Afterwards, he managed Holland Sport, Heerenveen, FC Groningen and various teams of the Royal Dutch Football Association (KNVB), including the women's national team. He also coached the men's national futsal team, achieving second place at the 1989 World Championship and qualification for the 1992 World Championship, 1996 UEFA Championship and 1996 World Championship. He retired in 1997.

References 

1937 births
Living people
Dutch football managers
Eredivisie managers
SC Heerenveen managers
FC Groningen managers
Netherlands women's national football team managers
Futsal coaches
Dutch footballers
Association football defenders
People from Grootegast
Footballers from Groningen (province)